The Johnstown Chiefs were an American professional ice hockey team based in Johnstown, Pennsylvania. They played in the East Coast Hockey League (eventually shortened to ECHL). The franchise was originally established in January 1988 as a member of the All-American Hockey League. In June 1988, the franchise would become one of the five new franchises of the ECHL.  Since their foundation in 1988, the Chiefs have played their home games at the Cambria County War Memorial Arena. The Chiefs were last owned by former New York Rangers general manager Neil Smith. Although the Chiefs franchise was moved to Greenville, the name, records, logos and all names identifying the Johnstown history have been retained by a non-profit organization.

Coaching History
There have been 10 head coaches for the Chiefs franchise. The franchise's first head coach was Joe Selenski, who held the position while the team was a member of the AAHL. Former NHL player Steve Carlson - also famous for his role in the movie Slap Shot (movie) as one of the Hanson brothers - was the only coach who took the Chiefs to the then-Riley Cup Finals, losing four games to three to the Carolina Thunderbirds. Ed Johnstone coached the Chiefs to three consecutive thirty-win seasons, but only advanced past the first round of the playoffs once. Former NHL enforcer Nick Fotiu coached the Chiefs from 1995 to 1997, managing 47 wins in his first two seasons. He started the 1997-98 ECHL season with six wins in his first thirty games, and eventually was replaced by assistant coach Scott Allen. Allen experienced the longest and most successful runs of all the previous Chiefs coaches, having coached the team for 324 regular season games, and taking the team to the second round of the playoffs three of his four full seasons as head coach. Former Chiefs goaltender Toby O'Brien would assume the role of coach in 2003. Despite missing the postseason two of his three years, O'Brien would also lead the Chiefs to the best record in their 22-year history, going 45-20-7. During the final five years, the Chiefs would go through three more coaches (Frank Anzalone, Ian Herbers, and Jeff Flanagan) before owner Neil Smith stepped down to the bench for the final thirty seven games in Chiefs history.

Key

Coaches

References

Johnstown Chiefs coaches